Christine Falls is a waterfall on Van Trump Creek in Pierce County, Washington. The falls are  feet high and are best known for the Christine Falls Bridge spanning the lower drop. The lower tier is probably one of the most commonly photographed locations in the Mount Rainier area.

The falls were named in honor of Christine Van Trump, the daughter of P. B. Van Trump. In 1889 Christine, then nine years old, accompanied her father on an ascent of Mount Rainier, as far as her strength would allow. She made it to the  level, even though she had a crippling nervous disorder.

Debris flows of 2001 
The debris flows of 2001 scoured the creek's banks clean of plant life, and altered the falls.  It took a large chunk of rock and dumped it into the upper tier of the falls, altering it a bit.

References

External links 
 

Mount Rainier National Park
Waterfalls of Pierce County, Washington
Waterfalls of Washington (state)
Tourist attractions in Pierce County, Washington
Tiered waterfalls